The Chiesa della Maternità or Church of the Maternity, is a Roman Catholic parish church located on via San Francesco in Pesaro, region of Marche, Italy.
 
A church at the site existed since 1216, but the present structure dates to a reconstruction in 1732 by the architect Giovanni Battista Togni with some help from Antonio Rinaldi and Luigi Vanvitelli, though retaining a centralized layout. The portal is made of rough stone bricks (bugnato), and above the portal is the coat of arms of the Della Rovere family. Also above the portal a bas-relief of the Santissimo Sacramento. High above on the facade is a clock. The church has an 18th-century bell-tower. The interior has three 18th-century frescoed panels by the studio of Giovanni Andrea Lazzarini, including altarpieces depicting the Magdalen and Maries at the Tomb; Rest during Flight to Egypt, and St Benedict with Saints Mauro and Placido.

References

Roman Catholic churches in Pesaro
Neoclassical architecture in le Marche
18th-century Roman Catholic church buildings in Italy
Roman Catholic churches completed in 1732
Neoclassical church buildings in Italy